Our Friends From Frolix 8 is a 1970 science fiction novel by American writer Philip K. Dick.

Plot summary

In the 22nd century, the Earth is ruled by the "New Men", who have superhuman mental abilities, and the "Unusuals", who possess psionic abilities such as telepathy, telekinesis and precognition. (In its use of psychic abilities as a major plot element, this work is similar to Dick's novel Ubik.) Thors Provoni, who has gone deep into space to find help for his resistance to the ruling groups, is returning with a sentient protoplasmic alien being, a "Friend from Frolix 8" known as Morgo Rahn Wilc, to fight for the "Old Men", human beings who have none of the rulers' powers. Nick Appleton is a tire regroover - a lowly, if skilled, job; his son Bobby fails a Civil Service examination that is deliberately geared toward failing "Old Man" applicants. At the same time, Terran authorities are holding the "Under Man" activist Cordon in prison and preparing for his execution. Appleton becomes politicised, and falls for Charlotte ("Charley") Boyer, a sixteen-year-old subversive.  She is involved with alcoholic Denny (in this future, alcohol prohibition has returned as a social policy). After the authorities discover that Appleton has become "subversive", they attempt to apprehend him and Charley, whom Willis Gram is also obsessed with.

Meanwhile, Thors Provoni's craft has eluded Terran fleet defences and is rapidly nearing Earth, leading to paranoid fears among the ruling elite about the possibility of violent alien invasion. In the event, Provoni does land, but Morgo Rahn Wilc protects him from an assassination attempt. Provoni is actually a "New Man" and an "Unusual" at the same time, and, with the assistance of his alien companion, he strips all Unusuals of their psionic abilities, and all New Men of their advanced cognitive abilities, rendering the New Men intellectually disabled and capable only of childlike cognition.

External links
Official PKDick website review
Our Friends from Frolix 8 cover art gallery

1970 American novels
1970 science fiction novels
American science fiction novels
Novels by Philip K. Dick
Ace Books books